Singanalluru Puttaswamaiah Muthuraj (24 April 1929 – 12 April 2006), better known by his stage name Dr. Rajkumar, was an Indian actor, singer and producer who worked in Kannada cinema. Through his over five-decade long career of over 200 films, he was regarded one of the most pivotal and influential figures of the Kannada film industry. His films were praised for acting as a bridge between the popular and art films because of the theme of the story and their treatment. He debuted as a child actor in the 1942 Kannada film Bhakta Prahlada. His first role as an adult came in Sri Srinivasa Kalyana (1952) and as a lead, two years later, in Bedara Kannappa, which gave him stardom. He debuted as a singer with the track Om Namaha Shivaya from the 1956 film Ohileshwara. In 1960, he made his debut as a producer by producing Ranadheera Kanteerava. According to Ashish Rajadhyaksha and Paul Willemen in the book Encyclopedia of Indian Cinema, Ranadheera Kanteerava was the first "big hit" in Kannada cinema. In a film career spanning fifty years,  Rajkumar received eleven Karnataka State Film Awards, including nine Best Actor and two Best Singer awards, eight Filmfare Awards South, and one National Film Award. Along with Vishnuvardhan and Ambareesh, he is counted in Kannada cinema's "triumvirate" as its most celebrated actor.

In 1983, Rajkumar was honoured with the Padma Bhushan, India's third highest civilian award, for his contributions to Indian cinema, and the Dadasaheb Phalke Award in 1995. In 1985, he became the first Indian actor to receive the Kentucky Colonel, an honorary order from the governor of Kentucky, United States. On the occasion of the "Centenary of Indian Cinema" in April 2013, Forbes included his performance in Bangaarada Manushya on its list of "25 Greatest Acting Performances of Indian Cinema". Upon his death, The New York Times had described him as one of India's most popular movie stars. He received the NTR National Award in 2002 and was awarded an honorary doctorate from the University of Mysore. Dr. Rajkumar Samagra Charithre - a two-volume book by film critic D. Rukkoji on the life and achievements of Rajkumar won the Swarna Kamal Award at the 63rd National Film Awards under the National Film Award for Best Book on Cinema category. On the occasion of Rajkumar's 100th film Government of Karnataka honored him with the title of Nata Saarvabhouma. He is also the first film star to win the National Film Award for Best Male Playback Singer for the song Naadamaya Ee Lokavella from the film Jeevana Chaitra. The State Government established Dr. Rajkumar Award in 1993–94 to be given for lifetime achievement towards contributions to Kannada cinema.

Dr. Rajkumar's 1972 film Bangaarada Manushya was the longest running South Indian film at the time of its release. The film elevated him from being just another very popular actor to nearly demigod status among the masses. His 1986 film Anuraga Aralithu was the first Indian film to be remade in seven other languages. His 1973 film Gandhada Gudi was reported to be the first Indian film to be made on the concept of protection of forest and wildlife conservation with a focus on the need to preserve the flora and fauna at a time when the CITES treaty was signed with an aim to reduce the economic incentive to poach endangered species. The British daily newspaper The Guardian praised him for his subtle acting and described him as a humble, modest being who was a symbol of Kannada consciousness. ABC News acknowledged him as one of the greatest actors of his time and called him The Gentle Giant of Karnataka. In 2016, the Maharashtra State Government had prescribed the biography of the actor for its class VIII students detailing his achievements and contributions to the Kannada culture under the title Natasarvabhouma. In 1989, the critical failure of Parashuram led him to take a hiatus from acting. However, he returned to acting three years later, in 1992 with Jeevana Chaitra, which was a blockbuster running for more than a year in theatres. His final film was 2000's Shabdavedhi. He had a minimum of ten releases in each of the years from 1963 to 1971. He held the record for highest releases as a lead in a single year (16 in 1968) in Kannada movies for 24 years until it was broken by Malashri in 1992 with 19 releases.

Filmography

Discography
Please note that this is a partial discography.

Rajkumar has sung approximately 300 songs in movies and an excess of 400 devotional (non-film) songs in Kannada. Rajkumar trained in classical music when he was with Gubbi Veeranna's theatre troupe. The track Om Namaha Shivaya from the 1956 film Ohileshwara, which he also starred in, was his first song for a film. He subsequently sang "Thumbithu Manava", a duet with S. Janaki, for the movie Mahishasura Mardini (1959). However, he became a full-fledged singer only in 1974 when he sang in place of P. B. Sreenivas for Sampathige Savaal, who had till then sung for most songs picturized on Rajkumar, fell ill. Rajkumar sang the energetic Yaare Koogadali for the film which became widely popular during the time and is considered one of his best songs.

Rajkumar has been credited for having sung across various genres and each rendition according to the mood of the scene in the film. In "Yaaru Tiliyaru Ninna" for Babruvahana (1977), a prosodic form of Kannada poetry that required the tone to be a combination of sarcasm and anger, he blended the twin skills of theatrics and music. For Nee Nanna Gellalare (1981), he sang two songs—"Jeeva Hoovagide" and "Anuraga Enaytu"—beginning both with the refrain "I love you", that is full of Carnatic gamakas. After the same tone in the refrain, they take on a life of their own with the form according to love and happiness in the former and love but a discord in the latter. He is known widely for his rendition of "Nadamaya" for Jeevana Chaitra (1992), a song based on the raga of Todi and with complex graces and strings other ragas as it progresses. He switches ragas with ease, and sings complex swara patterns like a professional classical artiste. For the rendition, he was awarded the National Film Award for Best Male Playback Singer.

See also
 Kannada cinema
 List of Kannada films

Notes

References

Further reading
 Kannada cinema database by University of Pennsylvania
 

Indian filmographies
Male actor filmographies
Discographies of Indian artists